Sunday Best is a reality television singing competition series hosted by Kirk Franklin. It first aired on BET in October 2007.

In each season, the show and its judges set out to find the best undiscovered gospel talent in America. Finalists competed each week until a winner was crowned. The judges throughout the series' run included Gospel singers Yolanda Adams, Kierra Sheard, Donnie McClurkin, Mary Mary, Bebe Winans & Cece Winans. Gospel singer Kim Burrell served as the on-screen mentor. 

Each season's winner receives a national recording contract, a new automobile, and an undisclosed cash prize benefiting his or her community as well as the title of 'Sunday Best'.

On April 18, 2019, it was announced that the series will return for a ninth season, which premiered on June 30, 2019. Franklin returned as host and former Mary Mary member Erica Campbell also returning as a judge, with Kelly Price and Jonathan McReynolds joining as judges.  Sunday Best was renewed by BET for a tenth season which premiered on July 5, 2020.

Winners
Season 1: Crystal Aikin - Verity Records

Debut album Crystal Aikin released March 17, 2009.

Season 2: Y'Anna Crawley - Imago Dei Music Group

Debut album The Promise released August 24, 2010.

Season 3: Le'Andria Johnson - Music World Gospel

Debut album Awakening of Le'Andria Johnson released September 6, 2011.

Christmas EP "Christmas Best" released December 6, 2011.

First winner to receive a Grammy Award (2012, Best Gospel/Contemporary Christian Music Performance)

Season 4: Amber Bullock - Music World Gospel

Debut album So In Love released July 10, 2012.

Season 5: Joshua Rogers

Debut album Well Done released December 4, 2012.

Season 6: Tasha Page-Lockhart

Debut single Different released in mid-2014.

Debut album Here Right Now released on August 5, 2014

Season 7: Geoffrey Golden 

Debut album Kingdom...Live! released on August 17, 2015

Season 8 (Sunday Best All-Stars): Dathan Thigpen (also from Season 3) 

Debut album GetUp Vol. 1 Get Exposed To Unadulterated Praise released on January 1, 2006

Season 9: Melvin Crispell III 

Debut album Prologue III released on September 20, 2019

Season 10: Stephanie Summers 

Debut album Mighty Strong God released on October 22, 2021

Seasons

References

External links
 BET Shows – Sunday Best
 

2000s American reality television series
2010s American reality television series
2020s American reality television series
2007 American television series debuts
2015 American television series endings
2019 American television series debuts
BET original programming
Singing talent shows
American television series revived after cancellation